= Orthogenium =

Orthogenium femorale

Scientific classification
- Kingdom: Animalia
- Phylum: Arthropoda
- Class: Insecta
- Order: Coleoptera
- Suborder: Adephaga
- Family: Carabidae
- Subfamily: Harpalinae
- Genus: Orthogenium; Chaudoir, 1835
- Species: O. femorale

Binomial name
- Orthogenium femorale Chaudoir, 1835

Species of beetle

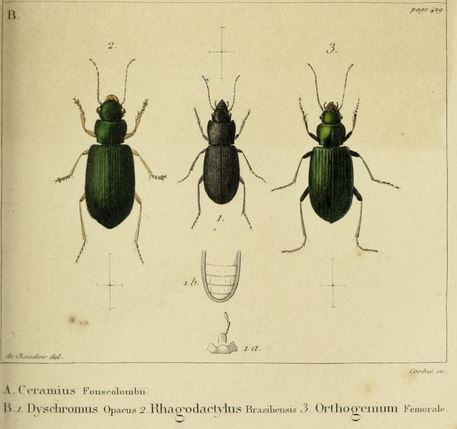

Orthogenium femorale is a species of beetle in the family Carabidae, the only species in the genus Orthogenium.

The status of this genus and species is considered doubtful or invalid.
